Nathan Clifford (August 18, 1803 – July 25, 1881) was an American statesman, diplomat and jurist.

Clifford is one of the few people who have served in all three branches of the U.S. federal government. He represented Maine in the U.S. House of Representatives from 1839 to 1843, then served in the administration of President James K. Polk as the  U.S. Attorney General from 1846 to 1848 and as the U.S. Ambassador to Mexico from 1848 to 1849. In the latter office, he signed the Treaty of Guadeloupe Hidalgo. In 1858, President James Buchanan appointed Clifford to be an associate justice of the U.S. Supreme Court. Clifford served on the Supreme Court until his death in 1881.

Early life and education 
Clifford was born on August 18, 1803 in Rumney, New Hampshire to Deacon Nathaniel Clifford and his wife Lydia (née Simpson). He was the eldest and only son of seven children. His family were of old Yankee stock. As a young girl in 1672, his great-great-grandmother Ann Smith was an accuser of Goody Cole, the only woman in New Hampshire convicted of witchcraft.

He attended the public schools of that town, then the Haverhill Academy in New Hampshire, and finally the New Hampton Literary Institute (now known as the New Hampton School).

Early career 
After teaching school for a time, he studied law in the offices of Josiah Quincy III and was admitted to the bar in Maine in 1827, establishing his first practice in Newfield, Maine.

He served in the Maine House of Representatives from 1830–34 and served as Speaker of the House from 1833–34. He was then Maine Attorney General from 1834–38, when he entered national politics.

U.S. House of Representatives (1839–43) 
Initially, Clifford ran for the Senate and lost. Then, Clifford was elected as a Democratic Representative to the 26th and 27th Congresses, serving March 4, 1839 through March 3, 1843.

In Washington, he followed the Democratic party line on policies, and was a strong supporter of the Van Buren administration. Clifford was opposed to a high tariff, supported internal improvements, endorsed state banking, and was in favor of federal retrenchment. He also criticized abolition, saying that its supporters were well intentioned but denounced the "mean and incendiary schemes of political Abolitionists."

Due to re-redistricting and political infighting, Clifford was not a candidate for re-election in 1842.

Polk administration

U.S. Attorney General (1846–48) 
In 1846, President James K. Polk appointed him 19th Attorney General of the United States after his predecessor, John Y. Mason, returned to being Naval Secretary. Clifford served in Polk's Cabinet from October 17, 1846, to March 17, 1848.

Ambassador to Mexico (1848–49) 
Clifford resigned his post with the Justice Department to become the U.S. Envoy Extraordinary and Minister Plenipotentiary to Mexico, serving from March 18, 1848, to September 6, 1849. It was through Clifford that the Treaty of Guadalupe Hidalgo was arranged with Mexico, by which California became a part of the United States.

A Whig Presidential victory meant that Clifford was recalled to the United States. Following his service in the diplomatic corps, Clifford resumed the practice of law in Portland, Maine.

Associate Justice of the Supreme Court (1858–81)

Appointment 
On December 9, 1857, President James Buchanan nominated Clifford as an associate justice of the United States Supreme Court, to a seat vacated by Benjamin R. Curtis. Clifford's nomination came in the immediate wake of the Dred Scott v. Sandford decision and was hotly contested. As a longtime partisan Democrat, the opposition labeled Clifford a political hack and a "doughface" — a Northern man with Southern sympathies. Anti-slavery representatives in the United States Senate fiercely opposed Clifford due to his pro-slavery record. After a 34 day-long confirmation process, the U.S. senate narrowly confirmed Clifford on January 12, 1858, by a  vote. He was sworn into office on January 21, 1858.

At the time Clifford joined the Court, all but one of the justices were affiliated with the Democratic Party. By 1872, Clifford had outlived his Democratic colleagues, and his new Republican colleagues tended to outvote him for his remaining nine years on the Court. Therefore, about one-fifth of all his opinions were in dissent. He wrote the majority opinion in 398 cases. His opinions were comprehensive essays on law and have sometimes been criticized as overly lengthy and digressive.

Legal philosophy 
Justice Clifford rarely declared any legal philosophy about the U.S. Constitution but believed in a sharp dividing line between federal and state authority. One admirer, U.S. Senator James W. Bradbury, said Clifford's view was that the Constitution was not an "elastic instrument to be enlarged or impaired by construction, but to be fairly interpreted according to its terms, and sacredly maintained in all its provisions and limitations, as the best guaranty for the perpetuity of our republican institutions." Clifford supported a mechanical jurisprudence adhering to the strict text of the Constitution.

Clifford's fields of expertise were commercial and maritime law, Mexican land grants, and procedure and practice. Clifford's major contribution to constitutional interpretation may have been his dissent in Loan Association v. Topeka rejecting "natural law" or any ground other than clear constitutional provision as a basis for the Court to use to strike down legislative acts.

Civil War 
During the Civil War, Clifford remained loyal to the Union. He distrusted federal authority, but generally upheld federal power as far as was necessary to prosecute the war. Some exceptions were the Prize Cases, where he joined the dissent in arguing that the blockade of the Confederacy was illegal without a declaration of war, and Ex parte Milligan, where he joined the majority to limit the use of military tribunals to prosecute citizens when civilian courts were available.

Reconstruction 
During Reconstruction, Clifford continued his skepticism of the federal government, now unrestrained by any consideration for the exigencies of wartime emergency powers. He more readily voted to limit federal power and make it easier for the South to rejoin the Union. In Cummings v. Missouri and Ex parte Garland, Clifford joined the majority in outlawing test oaths as part of the conditions of returning to the Union.

Legal Tender cases 
Perhaps Clifford's most prominent declaration against exercise of federal authority came in the Legal Tender cases. The cases dealt with the Legal Tender Act of 1862, passed to permit the issuance of paper money to pay war debts and establishing that paper currency would be valid as legal tender. In Hepburn v. Griswold (1870), a debtor whose note was made prior to the Act's passage challenged its application to her debt. Clifford joined the majority in a 5–3 decision holding that the Legal Tender Act could not constitutionally apply to preexisting debts.

Almost immediately after Griswold, the composition of the Supreme Court changed. Terminally ill Justice Robert Grier, who had joined the majority in Hepburn, resigned. President Ulysses S. Grant filled his seat with William Strong. The Court was also expanded by an Act of Congress from eight to nine members, with Joseph Bradley filling the new seat.

This change had an immediate impact on the pending case Knox v. Lee (1871). The case dealt with remuneration for goods confiscated by the Confederate Army. The lower court ruled that the plaintiff must be repaid in paper money and that the defendant had to pay the difference in the valuation of the goods in gold to greenbacks. Justice Clifford, joined by Justices Field and Nelson, dissented from the grant of certiorari, stating publicly, "I dissent from the order of the Court in these cases, especially from that part of it which opens for re-argument the question whether... the Legal Tender Act is constitutional as to contracts made before its passage—as I hold that the question is conclusively settled by the case of Hepburn vs Griswold..."

On May 1, 1871, the Court ruled 5–4 to overturn Hepburn v. Griswold and find the Legal Tender Act constitutional — facially and as applied to pre-existing debt. The four justices who formed the majority in Hepburn (minus the late Justice Grier) all dissented in Knox. The new justices, Bradley and Strong, were the deciding factor. Clifford submitted an 18,000 word dissent, angered that the Court would reverse its opinion in such a short amount of time. He also argued that the Legal Tender Act was facially unconstitutional, arguing that only hard money (gold and silver) with intrinsic value could serve as legal tender.

Reconstruction amendments 
Clifford held to a limited interpretation of the Reconstruction amendments. He joined the majority in the Slaughter-House Cases (1873), which distinguished state and federal citizenship and held that the Fourteenth Amendment only protects the narrower rights of federal citizens. In Hall v. DeCuir (1878), Justice Clifford wrote a separate concurrence to uphold segregation on steamships, coining the phrase "equality is not identity." His concurrence may have foreshadowed the principle of "separate but equal" laid down after his death, in Plessy v. Ferguson (1893).

Compromise of 1877 

Clifford was president of the Electoral Commission convened in 1877 to determine the outcome of the 1876 presidential election. Clifford voted for fellow Democrat Samuel Tilden, but Rutherford B. Hayes won by a single vote.

Clifford believed that the commission erred in nullifying Tilden's apparent victory and never accepted Hayes as the lawful president. Still, he signed off on Hayes' order for inauguration. In this instance Clifford put the country before his strong party beliefs, and his personal hope of having a Democratic president choose his successor.

By 1877, Clifford's mental faculties had declined and impaired his ability to be an effective Justice. Justice Samuel Miller wrote that Clifford's mental deterioration was "obvious to all of the Court" and "in the work we do, no man ought to be there after 70." (Clifford was 74.) In 1880, Clifford experienced a stroke that, according to Miller, "rendered him a babbling idiot." He did not participate in any cases during that year, but still refused to step down, hoping that a Democratic president would be elected in 1880 and appoint a successor. He died on July 25, 1881, his successor on the bench, Horace Gray, instead being appointed by Republican president Chester Arthur.

Personal life 
As a young lawyer in Newfield, Clifford met his wife, Hannah Ayer. They had six children.

Death and legacy 
Clifford died on July 25, 1881, in Cornish, Maine, and is interred in Evergreen Cemetery in Portland.

The Nathan Clifford Elementary School in Portland is named for him. Clifford's son, William Henry Clifford, was a successful lawyer and an unsuccessful candidate for the Maine State House of Representatives. His grandson, also named Nathan Clifford, was also a lawyer and briefly president of the Maine State Senate.

See also 
List of justices of the Supreme Court of the United States

References

Further reading 
Clifford, Philip G., Nathan Clifford, Democrat from 1803 to 1881, New York: G. P. Putnam's Sons, 1922.

External links 

 

|-

|-

|-

|-

1803 births
1881 deaths
19th-century American diplomats
19th-century American judges
19th-century American politicians
Ambassadors of the United States to Mexico
American Congregationalists
American Unitarians
Burials at Evergreen Cemetery (Portland, Maine)
Democratic Party members of the United States House of Representatives from Maine
Maine Attorneys General
Maine lawyers
People from Rumney, New Hampshire
People from Newfield, Maine
Polk administration cabinet members
Speakers of the Maine House of Representatives
United States federal judges appointed by James Buchanan
United States Attorneys General
Justices of the Supreme Court of the United States
New Hampton School alumni